The Canary Diamond is an uncut canary-yellow 17.86 carat diamond found in 1917 at what is now Crater of Diamonds State Park in Arkansas. It is in the collection of the Smithsonian Museum of Natural History. The diamond was in the collection of civil engineer and mineral collector Washington Roebling; his son donated it, along with the rest of Roebling's collection, to the museum in 1926 after Roebling's death.

See also 

 List of diamonds

References 

Diamonds originating in the United States
Gemstones
Individual diamonds